Mala Santa (Spanish for "Bad Saint") is the debut studio album by American singer Becky G. It was released on October 17, 2019 through Kemosabe Records, RCA Records and Sony Music Latin.

The album debuted at number 85 on the US Billboard 200 and number 3 on the Top Latin Albums chart with first week sales of 8,000.

Background
In April 2016, in an interview with Teen Vogue, Gomez first spoke about the possibility of releasing an album. However, it was not until 2019 that she went forward with the project. On March 22, 2019, it was reported that the singer was working on two studio albums simultaneously, one to be released in English and the other one in Spanish. As of March 2019, it was unclear if any of the songs she had released up until this point would appear on a future album. In July 2019, she stated that her album was expected to be released later that year. On October 8, 2019, Gomez took to social media to reveal the release date and the cover art of her upcoming debut studio album. The album became available for pre-order on October 11, 2019.

Accolades

Track listing
Track listing adapted from Apple Music.

Charts

Weekly charts

Year-end charts

Certifications

Release history

References

2019 debut albums
Becky G albums
Spanish-language albums
Sony Music Latin albums
Kemosabe Records albums
RCA Records albums